Lift Off was an Australian children's television series that was developed and produced by Patricia Edgar and broadcast on ABC Television from 1992 until the series ended in 1995. Each episode featured a live action storyline about a group of young children, and the problems they encountered with growing up, their parents, and various other social issues. Episodes would also feature segments of short animation, puppetry and documentary segments, as well as various songs, stories, and word games. Aimed at 3- to 8-year-olds, the series was linked with the school curricula through the Curriculum Corporation of Australia. The different episodes used stories and locations to explore subjects such as jealousy, loneliness and anger. The puppet characters were designed by illustrator Terry Denton and were constructed by the sculptor Ron Mueck.

Plot
The central focus on the program is the child actors who are aged between 4 and 10 years. Coming from different cultural, social, and familial backgrounds, the small group of seven children approach their environment with a sense of adventure, fantasy and inquiry. These children feature in the drama elements of the program but are the departure point for all other elements of the program.

Lift Off's heart is its characters: children, adults, puppets, performers-live and animated. Central to Lift Off is the activity of a core group of children. Their play, interactions and inquires from the idea or theme around which each episode revolves. The parents of the main characters are seen in every episode and their interactions reflect a variety of family situations.

The other fantasy characters in Lift Off include: EC-a rag doll, a puppet, a confidante, a friend.

Another of the main characters in the program is a lift called Lotis. Based in the apartment building where two of the families live, Lotis is, to the adult observer, a normal, everyday lift. It takes people to the desired floor, greets them vocally and frustrates them occasionally with its unreliability. To the children, however, Lotis is a friend, a mentor and a fellow explorer of their world. Lotis is an artificial intelligence. She has a computer matrix screen on her back wall on which appear clues, questions, diagrams and games. She is able to take them anywhere in space or time and will sometimes open her doors on the surface of the moon, the beach or the bottom of the ocean.

There are other puppets in Lift Off. Rocky, the frill-necked lizard is an anthropologist and documentary cameraman who is seen fleetingly on location gathering material about the human characters in the program. His humorous documentary films are shown to an audience of frill-necked lizards towards the end of each episode and reflect on the folly of the "two-footers".

The backsacks are another species of regular puppet characters. Travelling on the backs of the children, these limbless eccentrics have a very different outlook on life, primarily because they spend their lives being thrown on the ground, hung on pegs, stuffed full of structure and their attitude to their owners. They are unrecognised workers of the puppet world.

Beverley and her Patches sit in the foyer of the building where most of the children live. There is no ordinary pot-she contains a very long stalk with an eye on the end of it that surveys the world. This is the link with the natural environment-through her eye we see the world.

The Patches have lives of their own. They can break away from the pot and become animated shapes which form and reform together to create other shapes or move to certain rhythms before jumping back onto the pot.

There are documentary segments which present specific skills. These might involve acrobats, gymnasts or dressage events-they model a range of skills which intrigue and challenge children.

Segments
The two main animation segments are "The Munch Kids" and the animated "Feature Story". "The Munch Kids" is a three-minute segment featuring edited discussions with children who tackle topics related to the episode theme. The resulting voice track is presented to animators who visually interpret aspects of the discussion.

Lift Off features a major puppet segment titled "The Wakadoo Café". Directed by Paul Nichola, written by Bob Ellis, Tony Watts and Nancy Black, the café is a dynamic busy social hub filled with fascinating characters and unusual guests. The drama is broken occasionally by performances of all kinds by guest artists, musicians and performers.

Lift Off features a wide range of documentary material, including original footage of Aboriginal children shot in Arnhem Land by Stephen Johnson showing children in skilled activities as well as at play. It also shows different environments, worlds, peoples, animals and plants. The world is presented to the children as an accessible and exciting environment, requiring understanding and care.

History
In its development the aim for lift off was to address the following challenge: what might be the shape and direction of a children's program for the 21st century, given the very best we know about children's minds and given our view of what would be in the best interests of Australian culture in the years ahead? Lift Off breaks with the conventions in many ways. The program's inclusion in the school curriculum, through the Curriculum Corporation, was a world first. Lift Off acknowledged no accepted wisdoms about the extent of children's abilities and their limits. It believed no one has gauged those limits.

Development of the series commenced in December 1988 with the intention of creating a program that would develop competent and autonomous children. Although not specifically curriculum driven, Lift Off aimed to stimulate all aspects of the child's development. Loosely based on 'multiple intelligence' theories of Dr Howard Gardner of Harvard University, the program combines elements of animation, drama, performance, puppetry and documentary. Each episode is thematically driven but does not take on a magazine format. Links are established between the elements in order to provide an episode structure.

Early in 1989, an initial research phase was commenced. Early childhood specialists, academics and practitioners in many fields, including early childhood development, language and literacy, literature, music, play, artistry, movement, child care, personal development and psychology were consulted. In July 1989, the Foundation conducted an intensive three-day series of seminars at Erskine House in Lorne, Victoria. The 62 participants came from every Australian State and Territory and from the US, New Zealand and Hong Kong. Their diverse range of skills and experience encompassed children's social and emotional development; early language, literacy and literature; logical-mathematical and philosophical thought; environment, health and technology education; children's play, folklore and culture; children's creativity and artistry. The participants discussed the development of children in the 3–8 age group, the potential value of the Howard Gardner Multiple Intelligence framework which was the proposed basis of the project, and the proposed content strands. From this seminar emerged a detailed statement of the program's philosophy, aims and objectives.

In November 1989, a selection of 45 creative personnel in the areas of writing, direction, animation, puppetry, performance, illustration, music and movement including ACTF staff, met for another series of seminars. The major focus of this four-day conference was the discussion and formulation of a program concept for the Lift Off series, such as the development of the characters, the structure of the episodes and the curriculum for the program.

Howard Gardner visited Australia in July 1991 to examine the Lift Off program and its development to that date. During the visit he wrote a short paper explaining the link between his theories and Lift Off: "It seeks to bridge the gap between our understanding of children’s mental processes and our understanding of what moves, excites, and engages them; and it seeks to blend our insights about television which entertains and television which educates"

"From all that I have learned about Lift Off it has been conceived and launched in the most impressive and mindful way. Engaging characters, appealing milieus, powerful story lines have been mobilised in the service of a world view in which it is natural to use one’s mind. The playful and yet mindful stance, the respect for thinking in any medium, the irreverence for pomp or prejudice, the links between activities that children enjoy carrying out and the filling of important and needed social roles, the willingness to discuss serious issues and not to jump to premature or canned answers-it is these features which set the program apart far more so to any particular educational philosophy, or any particular educational philosopher".

Problems of change

"individuals, be they parents, teachers, or even young children, are very difficult to change. Inertia operates with full force and even the most exciting educational innovations have rarely if ever yielded demonstrable long term effects. Indeed, in the US, despite massive reform efforts over the century, most classrooms are not much different than they were a century ago!"

External involvement

"Efforts are being initiated to help parents and teachers and children draw on Lift Off in ways in which they have rarely approached television: rather than sitting back and viewing the shows, viewers will have the opportunity to examine (and re-examine) individual segments so that they can become the centrepiece of educational discussion, just as magazines and kits for home use will help ensure that the programs become a stimulus to, rather than a toxin against, mindfulness".

"There is now talk in Australia about producing a society with clever children. If I were asked how one might fashion a society where the mind of the child is treated with the seriousness which it merits, and where the most powerful medium of our time were yoked with the other principal forces in the country, I could think of no better example than the efforts of the past three years to develop Lift Off series....Lift Off is an experiment. I would add now that it is an important experiment, not just for Australia but for the entire world. It deserves-ardently-to succeed as a genuine educational innovation, and I am cautiously optimistic that it will".The twenty-six Feature Stories have been written by some of Australia's top children's writers, illustrators and animators including Paul Jennings, Terry Denton, Peter Viska and Pamela Allen. These three-minute stories were produced by a number of animators who had worked on the foundation programs before as well as some talented newcomers.

Backlash
Alan Kendall (Executive Producer of 'Play School') strongly criticised Lift Off's principles as an educational show for 3- to 8-year-olds. In 1991, when the ACTF was pitching Lift Off to the ABC board Kendall argued that "Lift Off misses the point of television" and that it was dogmatic in its approach and would in fact "threaten the security of three to four-year-olds and create jagged attention patterns like Sesame Street".

Rising from the Backlash
Those who had attended Lift Off workshops (see Production section) explained to the Australian government and the ABC board how Lift Off would carve a new path and curriculum for juvenile education. Lift Off was approved and bought by the ABC. A few years later the ABC described Lift Off as "the most outstanding children’s programme broadcast by the ABC in 35 years of television".

Production
In 1988 the Patricia Edgar, director of the ACTF, decided to develop a program for 3- to 8-year-olds which aimed to develop children who:

-are competent and autonomous in all areas;

-can manage the world into which they have been brought;

-can contribute to the world's harmony;

-could have the capacity to improve the community in which they live.

Lift Off
Lift Off is a series of 52 half hours for 3 to 8 years old went into production in September 1991. Lift Off was the most ambitious television undertaking yet for the Foundation and was aimed at young children aged 3–8. The program was to be a 26-part series designed to play a vital role in the upbringing of every Australian child.

Lift Off 2
Production commenced in February 1994 and finished in October 1994. Lift Off 2 is a 26 x half-hour series for 3- to 8-year-olds which again combines drama, animation, puppetry and documentary thematically in each episode. The drama in the series revolves around the same regular cast as the first series. They are joined in the second series by several newcomers including Nikita Plummer who plays Annie, Poss and Nipper's younger sister. Mario Filinatzis who plays Marco and Jared Daperis who plays his younger brother, Ralph, from a new family which moves into the apartment building.

Workshops
In 1990, two workshops were held to consult sixty early childhood experts and creative film makers concerning the content and philosophy of the program.

Australian specialists working with children or studying child development were selected to attend the workshops and determine the principles and aims of Lift Off. The second workshop focused on the development of the show's characters as well as fantastical themes or plots to run with later on in production. The workshops were primary aimed as creating a new syllabus that Lift Off and its concepts and characters would be grounded by.

Activities during these workshops were deliberately practical and creative, for example, those who attended were asked to work in groups of individuals from vastly different fields (e.g. specialists in children's mathematics and researchers on juvenile human development) and were instructed to make things out of art materials, or discuss how to tackle certain tasks or challenges before gathering together and informing the entire group of their conclusions.

Outreach
Along with the television program a complementary Outreach program was developed to engage the community with young children and with the program. The Outreach was aimed at furthering Lift Off's impact beyond watching it on TV screens and included the production of books, toys, puzzles and other activities that helped to cement ideas and skills introduced to the children watching the program.

First Outreach
Approximately forty people attended the first Outreach workshop, held at Warburton in Victoria from 17–31 July 1990. Over the weekend large and small discussion groups brainstormed and analysed the best strategies for implementing a national Outreach scheme to accompany and support the Lift Off television program and amplify its reach and efficacy. The conference concentrated on: resources and materials; management structures; existing and new institutional and community works.

Outreach programs were set up in each state of Australia.

Educational packages

Lift Off
In 1990, two workshops were help to consult early childhood experts and creative film makers concerning the content and philosophy of the program. The materials were written by teachers seconded from the various Ministries of Education. Teacher's Guide to Lift Off was the first in a series of educational materials that were published at monthly intervals after the launch of the series.

The following programs which were later published were:

 Lift Off to Thinking and Wondering
 Lift Off to Language
 Lift Off to Science and Technology
 Lift Off to Social Learning and Living
 Lift Off to Environmental Education
 Lift Off to Play
 Lift Off to Social Growth and learning
 Lift Off to Language (2)

Each book was accompanied by a video anthology highlighting aspects of the series which are linked to the teacher's notes.

Lift Off 2
They were designed to complement the existing 'Lift Off in the Classroom' material published by the Curriculum Corporation with the first series.

 Lift Off To Fire Safety

The Foundation worked with the Metropolitan Fire Brigade in Melbourne to develop an education package around an episode of Lift Off 2 titled 'Heroes' which focuses on fire safety in the home. The materials were appropriate for children in early years of primary schooling nationally.

 Lift Off to Aboriginal Education

In consultation with representatives from Aboriginal arts and education organisations, two episodes of Lift Off were developed for distribution to schools.

Launch

Lift Off
The Prime Minister of Australia at the time, Mr. Keating launched Lift Off during a special screening and presentation at parliament House on 29 April 1992. In his speech he said: "If the children who watch Lift Off, and read the Lift Off spin offs, develop the same skills of communication, cooperation and execution as producers have displayed, we will really be able to say that this country is pretty clever. Lift Off also suggests that television is capable of-which is to say much more than we and our children are generally given".America's First lady at the time, Mrs Barbara Bush, gave a significant stamp of approval to the series when she visited the Foundation in January 1991 to preview Lift Off. She described Lift Off as "Just wonderful. This is an extraordinarily good program".

Lift Off was endorsed by the Directors of Curriculum from all States and Territories who agreed that "the program is very soundly based educationally" and "the proposed contents, scope and coverage of 'intelligences are consistent with the range of curriculum activities in the early years".

The Lift Off series of 52 half hours for 3- to 8-year-olds went to air on the ABC on 8 May 1992. In addition to being screened at 2:00pm on Fridays, it was repeated after school at 4:30 pm Monday to Friday from 29 June 1992. It was also seen on Saturday evenings from September 1992.

Lift Off 2
The series was launched by The Hon Peter Collins, QC, MP, NSW Minister for the Arts, at the Taronga Zoo in Sydney on 5 February 1995.

At the launch Mr Fish, James Jordan (Lafe Charlton), the pigs and wolf, and the Lift Off kids performed to a large crowd, made up of Board members and staff of the ACTF and the ABC, cast and crew members of Lift Off, representatives of the media, and their families.

Publishing and merchandise
The series was supported by a wide range of materials developed and marketed for children, child care professionals, educators, parents and other care-givers.

Octopus Publishing program

An agreement was put in place with the Octopus Publishing group of Australia whose educational publishing division was Rigby-Heinemann. William Heinemann handled children's books for the trade market.

The titles published as of 1992 included three hard cover picture story books:

 "Burping Baby" by Penny Robenstone Harris
 "Ice Flowers" by Jutta Goetze and Patricia Mullins
 "Dancing Pants" by Pamela Rushby and Maya;

And two soft cover story books:

"The Wakadoo Café" by Jim Howes and Terry Denton

"The Backsack Bulletin" by Rod Quantock and Ann James

Later published in 1992–93 included the Lift Off kid’s books:

 "Rocky on Assignment"
 "Adventures with EC"
 "Lift Off with Lotis"
 "Lift Off Fun Book"
 "Grandma’s knee"

Budget Book Publishing

It was known that for many families, the major (and often only) contact with books is through supermarkets. To reach this part of the Lift Off audience, a publishing program was agreed with Budget Books who were also part of the Octopus Group and sold directly into stores like K-mart, Coles, Woolworths and Big W. The first five books to be sold in these stores were:

 "Activity Pack"
 "Colouring Book"
 "Sticker Fun Book"
 "Paint 'n' Colour"
 "Fun With Felt"

The Lift Off Book

The Lift Off book was published in 1993. It targeted parents and highlighted how they might use Lift Off as a springboard for activities that enhance the quality of children's lives. The book explained how the program was shaped to cater for children's multiple intelligences. The material illustrated models for learning at this age and showed how they can be based on children's play. In addition to the information for parents, ideas for activities, games and for organising children's playtime were provided by the author Ralph Hampson.

Magazine

To coincide with the program's screening, a children's bi-monthly magazine was edited by Jim Howes and published by Text media. The magazine was 44 pages with full-colour throughout. The magazine featured Lift Off characters and encouraged children to undertake a wide range of activities.

Sales were by subscription as well as through newsagents and other major outlets including a national book club distributing to schools. The Outreach network is assisting promotion and distribution of the magazine.

Lift Off Merchandising

Available in retail outlets from September 1992 included:

 "Four frame tray jigsaw puzzles and four boxed jigsaw puzzles" by Murfett Regency
 "Three backsaks, an EC doll and finger puppets of the Wakadoo characters and Rocky" by Playcorp
 "Twelve greeting cards, two gift wraps and two gift cards" by John Sands Greetings
 "Lift Off clothes (T-shirts, shorts and skirts) exclusive to Myer Grace Bros and ABC Shops" by Motto Trading
 "Lift Off videos" by ABC Enterprises/Roadshow
 "'Songs from Lift Off' and 'more Songs from Lift Off'" by ABC Music/Polygram on CD and audiocassette\

Music
Music was a core component of Lift-Off 1 and 2. Many composers and lyricists were involved in writing songs for the series, and many composers were retained to write underscore for the programs. Chris Neal, who had been involved with various ACTF productions prior to Lift-Off, was heavily involved with the series and had the official title of Music Consultant, and wrote many of the songs for the Wakadoo Cafe puppets, as well as the Lift-Off theme song. David Cheshire was Music Director for both series, alongside Chris.

Composers and lyricists

Series 1
 Frank Strangio (Live Action Underscore)
 Paul Grabowsky (Wakadoo Café Underscore, one song and arranged another Wakadoo song)
 Danny Beckerman (Patches)
 Peter Mumme (Beverly Sequences)
 David Cheshire (Music Director, Live Action Underscore)
 Michael Atkinson (Rocky and Live Action Underscore)
 David Pyle (Animation)
 Rick Caskey (Animation)
 Greg Sneddon (Lotis, Live Action Underscore and two Live Action Songs)
 Chris Neal (Music Consultant, Wakadoo Cafe Songs, Theme Song and a Live Action Song)
 Bob Ellis (Lyricist with Chris Neal on Wakadoo Cafe Songs)
 David Crosbie (Animation)
 John Taylor (Animation)
 Chris Copping (Animation)
 Glenn Tabuteau (Animation)
 Ian Davidson (Live Action Underscore and a Backsak Song)
 Paul Livingston (Animation)
 Brian Lang (Various)
 Tommy Lewis (Didgeridoo)
 Kevin Hocking (Animation)
 Gareth Vanderhope (Animation)
 Peter Sullivan (Live Action Underscore)
 Niko Schauble (Co-composer with Paul Grabowsky)
 Felicity Foxx (Various)
 Charlie McMahon (Animation)
 Rory O'Donoghue (Animation)
 Yuri Worontschak (Co-composer with Paul Grabowsky)
 Garth Boomer (Lyricist with various songwriters)
 Tony Watts (Lyricist on 'Doris Sings the Blues' with Paul Grabowsky and 'Into the Unknown' with Michael Atkinson)
 Will Conyers (Four Wakadoo Cafe songs)
 John Rogers (Lyrics for 'The Hot Seven Song' with Will Conyers
 Mark Mitchell (Lyrics for 'No Entry' song)
 Peter Dasent ('Which One?' song)
 Janet Preston ('Going Under' song)
 Denny Lawrence ('Going Under' song)
 Steve Matters ('Something Tells Me' song)
 Lynette 'Tubby' Justice ('Something Tells Me' song)
 Alan Harding ('Scratch Song')
 David Sandford ('Threads' music, various saxophone solos on other songs)
 Betty Greenhatch ('Threads' lyrics)
 Paul Begaud (Composed 'It's Not Fair' and 'Destroy')
 Les Gock (Composed 'The Wheel Turns')
 Mike Brady (Producer of various songs, composed 'Do You Remember?')

E. C. Plays Lift-Off
 Chris Neal (Titles music)
 Helena Harris (Titles lyrics, adapted from Chris Neal's original work)
 Paul McDermott (Underscore)

Lift-Off 2
 Frank Strangio (Live Action Underscore)
 Paul Grabowsky (Wakadoo Cafe Underscore)
 Danny Beckerman (Patches)
 David Cheshire (Music Director, Various Songs and Live Action Underscore)
 Michael Atkinson (Rocky and Live Action Underscore)
 Michael Easton (Co-Composer with Michael Atkinson)
 David Pyle (Animation)
 Rick Caskey (Animation)
 Chris Copping (Animation)
 Chris Neal (Music Consultant, Various Songs and Live Action Underscore)
 Braedy Neal (Thrash, the Dog - Animated Segments)
 David Arden (Wrote 'Give and Take' song)
 Mandy Rollins (Various)
 Elizabeth Wertheim (Various)
 Alan Harding (Composer 'What's Missing?' and 'Wakadoo Rap')
 Rory O'Donoghue (Animation)
 Cass Wigley (Animation)
 Paul Rigby (Animation)
 Cezary Skubiszewski (Animation)
 Jan S. Goldfeder (Animation)
 David Crosbie (Animation)
 Garry Taylor (Animation)
 Terry Spencer (Animation)
 Sue Amoddio (Lyricist)
 Chris Anastasiades (Lyricist)
 Ray Boseley (Lyricist)
 Christine Madafferi (Lyricist)
 Robert Greenberg (Lyricist)
 Cameron Clarke (Lyricist)
 Susie Campbell (Lyricist)

Lift-Off Live
 Chris Neal (Music Director, Music, Lyrics, Score, and Head of Music Production)
 Chris Anastassiades (Lyricist)
 Garth Boomer (Lyricist)
 Ray Boseley (Lyricist)
 Robert Greenberg (Lyricist)
 Sue Amoddio (Lyricist)

Recording and editing process
In the first series, the recording process of the Wakadoo puppet songs was unorthodox and unusual. Pioneered by Paul Nichola, the director, it was decided to record the vocals 'live' while shooting to give more character to the performances. While a good idea in practice, this meant that a lot of work would have to be done to clean the vocal tracks up for future soundtrack releases, which was successfully done for the two 1992 albums 'Songs from Lift-Off 1' and 'More Songs from Lift-Off 2'. Some songs were recorded entirely in studio such as 'All Together Now', 'The Hot Seven Song' and 'Wanting'. In the second series, all of the songs were recorded in studio to avoid potential sync problems and other issues. This allowed the vocalists the ability to concentrate solely on their singing but this meant that the focus would be more on  the audible performance rather than the visual.

Many of the songs on the two aforementioned albums, while more polished in a technical sense were also truncated and shortened for unknown reasons. Alternate vocal takes were used for some songs including some not by the original performers, most notably 'Out of Order' and 'The Wheel Turns'. It is believed that these were the original scratch tracks produced by Mike Brady, but the vocalists are currently unknown. Some songs featured fade out endings despite being produced with proper endings, as heard in the television episodes. The albums for the second series were presented as more accurate, full length soundtrack albums. David Cheshire was the music editor for the series and created various long and short versions of the songs using the old fashioned method of splicing tape with a razor blade. He also was one of the first musicians in Australia to use the Pro-Tools system, which he used to create shorter versions of the 'theme' songs for every episode.

Music rights issues and reissues of the albums
John Hopkins of Screensong Pty Ltd owned the publishing and phonographic rights to all of the songs and music in the series. It has been reported by many composers that he either paid them no royalties at all or only for a short period of time. Unfortunately, many of them were unable to be compensated at the time of production of the series, leading to many complications internally. Hopkins fled overseas toward the end of the 90s and has not made contact with the original composers.

In 2021, the publishing and phonographic rights were obtained by Joseph Marshall, owner and operator of indie record label 'Silbert Records'. Joseph, with the blessing of the original composers, Dr. Patricia Edgar and others involved heavily in the production of Lift-Off, is in the process of restoring all the songs, and demo versions of as many as possible to their original versions, with the intention of ensuring the composers and lyricists are able to receive proper royalties and re-circulating the Lift-Off music. Where impossible, new recordings are being created. In 2022, the original musical cast recording for 'Lift-Off Live' was released digitally in a remastered form with several bonus and previously unreleased tracks, and this album was shortly followed by another; "Songs from Lift-Off 1 (The Chris Neal Collection)" featuring all of Chris Neal's songs for the series, and previously unheard demo versions of each track. Both of these albums are distributed by Silbert Records. More are to follow, according to Joseph.

Success
Lift Off went to air on the ABC on 8 May 1992. In addition to being screened at 2:00 pm on Fridays, it was repeated after school at 4:30 pm Monday to Friday from 29 June 1992 and was screened Saturday evenings from September 1992. The Foundation received a substantial amount of Lift Off fan mail from children and adults.

Re-screenings

Lift Off
 Weekly on the ABC from July through to September 1993.
 In the 4:30 pm weekday time slot on the ABC on 7 September 1994.
 On the ABC from 7 July to 25 October 1994, in the 4:30 pm weekday time slot.

Lift Off 1 & 2
 The ABC screened the Lift Off 2 at 4:30 pm weekdays from 17 February 1995 and weekly at 8:30 am Sunday from 4 April 1995.
 Lift Off 2 re-screened weekly on the ABC at 8 am on Sunday mornings, for 26 weeks from 6 August 1995.
 Lift Off, in its one-hour format, screened on the ABC at 1 pm on Thursdays from 1 August 1996. This was immediately followed by Lift Off 2, concluding on 24 April 1997.
 Lift Off 2 screened on the ABC at 8 am Sundays from 30 June 1996 in its half-hour format.
 Lift Off 2 screened in its half-hour format at 7:30 am on Sundays on the ABC from 13 April 1997 and concluded on 5 October 1997.
 The ABC screened episodes from lift Off 2 on Sunday mornings at 7:30 am from 6 July 1997 until 5 October 1997.
 The ABC repeated Lift Off 2, for the sixth time, during the school holidays in December 1998 and January 1999.
 The Disney Channel Australia screened Lift Off 1 & 2 twice daily on weekdays at 9:30 am and 2 pm continuously from 1 February 1999 until 11 April 2000. Both series were screened a total of three times by The Disney Channel during this extensive period.
 The ABC screened eleven episodes from Lift Off 2 at 10 am on weekdays from 27 September 1999 until 11 October 1999.

Sales

1994
To 30 June 1994 ABC Enterprises reported sales of 1,391 Lift Off videotapes with the most popular titles being The Story of EC, EC and the Lift Off Kids and Nipper & Aku.

The Curriculum Corporation distributed educational guides to Lift Off and to 30 June 1994, 268 of the Teachers' Guide to Lift Off books had been sold as well as almost 800 of the Lift Off educational Book and Video packs.

In the UK, the show was aired on Channel 4.

1995
ABC Enterprises reports sales of 23,475 Lift Off videos and 13,240 Lift Off CDs/audio cassettes to 30 June 1995.

Reed for Kids sold over 140,788 Lift Off story books and activity books to 30 June 1995.

Both series of Lift Off were sold to TV12 Singapore and the first series was sold to Television Airtime Services in Malaysia.

Canal J, a children's channel in France, agreed to acquire all 78 episodes of Lift Off 1 and 2. Canal J dubbed the series into French.

Coral Pictures entered into an agreement with the Foundation for the distribution of the Lift Off series in Spanish speaking territories and dubbed the series into Spanish. Subsequent sales were made to broadcasters in Mexico, Panama, and Argentina.

Middle East media acquired the Lift Off series for Arabic speaking territories.

ABC for Kids released a video 'Imagine EC and me' in June 1995 and planned to release further titles over the following 12 months. They also released two CDs/audio cassettes of the Lift Off 2 music, Wakadoo Rap and Brand New Songs From Lift Off.

1996
FOXTEL acquired pay television rights in the 52 episodes of Lift Off 1 and EC Plays Lift Off for its Fox Kids' Network.

ABC Video released Imagine, EC & Me, from the Lift Off 2 series on the video sell-through market.

1997
Lift Off 1 was sold to Sri Lanka. Lift Off 1 and 2 were sold to Canal J France, Cook Islands, Panama and Argentina. The Foundation entered into an agreement with Daro Film Distribution for the Distribution of both series in Eastern Europe.

1998
Lift Off 1 was sold to the Italian public broadcaster, the RAI, the Namibian Broadcasting Corporation and the Tzu Chi Television Network in Taiwan. Canal J put both series one and two of Lift Off to air daily in France (Lift Off is known as Zig Zag in France). Following Canal J's success with the program both series were sold to the French language broadcaster, Le Canal Famille, in Canada. The Spanish language broadcaster, Telemundo Network in the United States acquired both series of Lift Off, as did Multivision Mexico (for pay television across Spanish speaking Latin America). Lift Off 2 was also sold to the Saskatchewan Communications Network in Canada.

1999
Carlo Television in Sri Lanka acquired more episodes of the Lift Off series.

The Disney Channel Australia acquired the Lift Off series.

Delta Music Plc in the United Kingdom released the Lift Off series on video.

2000
Lift off 1 & 2 were sold to GMTV in the United Kingdom and NRK Norway re-licensed the Thrash animated segments from lift off 2.

Cast

Children
 Poss Burke – Erin Pratten: A blonde haired, blue eyed young girl. Poss is Nipper's and Annie's big sister and the Burke's eldest child.
 Nipper Burke – Paul Cheyne: A blonde haired, blue eyed little boy. Nipper is Poss's little brother, Annie's big brother and the Burke's middle child.
 Annie Burke – Nikita Plummer (Series 2): A blonde haired, blue eyed preschooler-aged girl. Annie is Poss's and Nipper's little sister and the Burke's youngest child. Up until Series 2, Annie was known as "Baby Annie".
 Paul Jordan – Luke Carroll: A brown haired, brown eyed, Aboriginal young boy. He is Aku's big half-brother and the Jordan's eldest child.
 Aku Jordan – Aku Bielicki: A brown haired, brown eyed, half-Aboriginal, half-African-American little girl. She is Paul's little half-sister and the Jordan's youngest child.
 Turbo Garcia – Heber Yerien (Series 1): A brown haired, brown eyed adolescent boy who assists Snap Jordan in her "fix it" business. He is Max's big brother and the Garcia's eldest child.
 Max Garcia – Robert Peschel: A brown haired, brown eyed young boy who is deaf and requires a hearing aid. He is Turbo's little brother and the Garcia's youngest child.
 Marco Ponti – Mario Filintatzis (Series 2): A brown haired, brown eyed, disabled little boy who requires a wheelchair in some occasions. He is Raph's and "Baby Ponti's" big brother and the Ponti's eldest child. He, along with his family, moved into the Garcia's apartment in the very beginning of the first episode in Series 2 ("Brand New").
 Raph Ponti – Jared Daperis (Series 2): A brown haired, brown eyed preschooler-aged boy. He is Marco's little brother, "Baby Ponti's" big brother and the Ponti's middle child. He, along with his family, moved into the Garcia's apartment in the very beginning of the first episode in Series 2 ("Brand New").
 Kim Stinson – Maria Nguyen: A young Asian girl, who was adopted. She is the Stintson's only child.

Adults
 Jenny Burke – Madeleine Blackwell: Poss's, Nipper's and Annie's mother.
 Ted Burke – David Sandford: Poss's, Nipper's and Annie's father, who works as a musician, singer, and songwriter.
 Snap Jordan – Aku Kadogo (Series 1): Aku's biological mother and Paul's step-mother, who is of African-American descent. She, along with Turbo, runs a "fix it" business. She was replaced by her husband James; who is Paul's and Aku's biological father; after she moved back to the United States in Series 2.
 James Jordan – Lafe Charlton (Series 2): Paul's and Aku's biological father, who is of Aboriginal descent. He replaces his wife Snap for the "fix it" business.
 Teresa Garcia – Irini Pappas (Series 1): Turbo's and Max's mother.
 Ricardo Garcia – Petru Gheorghiu (Series 1): Turbo's and Max's father.
 Carla Ponti – Nadia Coreno (Series 2): Marco's and Raph's mother.
 Franco Ponti – John Orcsik (Series 2): Marco's and Raph's father, who works as a firefighter.
 Stella Stinson – Louise Le Nay: Kim's adoptive mother, who works as a real estate agent.
 Harry Stinson – Alan Fletcher: Kim's adoptive father, who works as an architect.
 Mr. (Seymour) Fish – Mark Mitchell: One of the most memorable characters and major antagonist of Lift Off — reminiscent of Oscar the Grouch in Sesame Street, but acts as an authority figure instead — Mr. Fish was the very strict, and therefore narcissist, and snobbish, caretaker of the small apartment building where the characters lived, by whom always take things very seriously. He was often seen yelling at the children from behind his desk in the apartment foyer when they came in from the outside. He owned numerous "no" signs, which he used to threaten the children. In the very last episode of the second-series finale ("From Where I Stand") he confiscated EC and felt guilty about it, which caused him to toss and turn when he tried sleeping while he was feeling sick due to a cold, EC came to him (the only time EC moved in front of an adult), calmed him down and gave him a dream about what if he had EC in his childhood. After the dream, he gave EC back to the kids in exchange for a telescope. the final shot was of him looking sad as he saw a happier version of him as a kid holding EC.
 "Mumsy" Fish – Mark Mitchell: Mr Fish's mum, who constantly drops in unannounced to check on Mr Fish. Despite the fact that he is an adult now, Mumsy treats him as if he is a child, much to Mr Fish's embarrassment and disgust. Throughout the series it is implied that she would not allow Seymour to run around and get dirty when he was a child.
 Bonza Men – Matt Quartermaine and Matt Parkinson: One-off guest characters played by the comedy duo Empty Pockets.

Puppet characters

Assistant puppeteers included Roy McNeill, Heather Monk, Rod Primrose, Jenny Sherlock, Michelle Spooner, Sue Blakey, Jenny Ishmakovich and Liss Gabb.

Lotis (voiced by Julie Forsyth) is a computer-programmed, artificial-intelligent, magical lift in the apartment building. She tries to help the younger characters with their personal problems, but cannot understand more complex human behaviour and thinking.

Beverley is a one-eyed plant that lives in the apartment foyer. She shows short documentary clips about the episode's subject matter. (Beverley was puppeteered by Peter Wilson in the first series, and Bob Parsons in the second).

EC ("Every Child" and formerly "Elizabeth and Charlie") is an automatic, animated, magical rag doll who is intended to appear to be genderless or even non-binary so as to be more widely relatable. At first, EC alternately stands for "Elizabeth and Charlie", which are the very first names that Poss and Kim give to EC in the very first episode in the first series ("A Load of Rubbish") before "Every Child" was accepted later. (EC was puppeteered by Peter Wilson in the first series, and Bob Parsons in the second).

Rocky the Frill-Necked Lizard is the leader of a colony of frilled-necked lizards. Rocky spies on the humans ("two-footers") and reports his findings to the rest of the colony. (Rocky was puppeteered by Will Conyers/Peter Wilson in the first series, and John Rogers/Bob Parsons in the second).

The Backsacks: the children's backpacks that came to life and spoke through their zipper mouths. There are 7 of them owned by each of the 7 Children. Each Backsack has a personality depending on their nicknames and gender roles. When Max and Turbo moved to the country in series 2, their backsacks, Gabblesak and Grumblesak, were passed along to Raph and Marco. And when Paul was getting too old for his backsack, Dippisak, he passed him along to Annie, Poss's and Nipper's younger sister. These are:

 Rapsak: Poss's backsack. He looks like a bug's head due to the antennae sticking out of his head. As the name suggests, he has an accent of a rastafarian, despite his straight, black flat-top hair and light pigmentation. (Puppeteered by Hugh Simpson in the first series)
 Snapsak: Nipper's backsack. As she has animal print allover — leopard/jaguar print on her chin and lower jaw and tiger print on her upper jaw, cheeks and forehead — and a Victorian accent, Snapsak appears to have a personality of an old-fashioned, middle-aged posh lady. (Puppeteered by Liz Rule)
 Dippisak: Paul's backsack in series 1 and Annie's backsack in Series 2. He has red sides with white spots, a dark and light blue striped forehead, red zipper nose, medium blue lips, light blue lower jaw, and red bottle-lid eyes. He appears to be cross-eyed and is a little bit shy, nervous, and embarrassed when engaging a conversation with other backsacks. (Puppeteered by David Collins in the first series)
 Tweesak: Aku's backsack. She has light pigmentation, straight, golden-brown flat-top hair, blue button eyes, and a two-tone jacket; pink with blue spots on her left side and blue with pinks triangles on her right side. As the name suggests, she also has a well pronounced Georgian British accent as well. (Puppeteered by Janette Dalgliesh in the first series)
 Grumblesak: Turbo's backsack in series 1 and Marco's backsack in series 2. Due to the role changes of Grumblesak's gender in series 1 and 2, they may be non-binary. As the name suggests, they have a bit of an attitude problem when engaging a conversation with other backsacks. They too also considers themselves to be the "grandmaster", main leader and the oldest of all the backsacks. (Puppeteered by Janette Dalgliesh in the first series)
 Gabblesak: Max's backsack in series 1 and Raph's backsack in series 2. He is golden-brown with a purple nose, green lips, orange hair, and is the only backsack to have only one eye instead of two as well as his American accent. As the name suggests, he can be very loud sometimes and often raises his voice at other backsacks when engaging them in a conversation. (Puppeteered by Hugh Simpson in the first series)
 Scruffsak: Kim's backsack. He is blue with orange curly hair. As the name suggests, he has isolated "teeth" and is a bit of a mess sometimes when engaging in a conversation with the other backsacks as he thinks of negative things as positive. (Puppeteered by David Collins in the first series)

Wakadoo Café puppet characters
 Boris: The ugliest and most ignorant of the three pigs. (Puppeteered by John Rogers)
 Morris: Morris is slightly less antagonising than Boris but is still a pain. (Puppeteered by David Collins in the first series and Sean Masterson in the second)
 Doris: Doris is the only female pig but is just as aggravating as Boris and Morris. (Puppeteered by Janette Dalgliesh in the first series and Megan Cameron in the second)
 Wolf: Wolf is employed as an entertainer, along with the three pigs despite their love/hate relationship. Though he is very self-centred and arrogant on the outside, he has been known to show his kind side, proving that he does indeed have a good heart on the inside. (Puppeteered by Hugh Simpson in the first series and Francesco "Frank" Italiano in the second)
 Boss: The rather strict manager of the café, it's not uncommon for the café's employees to hold a grudge against her, though this never lasts long, as despite her rudeness, Boss' good side often shines through in the end. Her real name is Hortense. She also has an upper-class Australian accent and wears a golden crown on her head as well. (Puppeteered by Liza-Mare Syron)
 Nearly: A kind-hearted yet clumsy, and "hairy from head-to-toe" member of the group. He is in charge of the drinks. Nearly is prone to depression and is very nervous around others. (Puppeteered by Philip Millar in the first series and Malcolm Martin in the second)
 Zelda: Nearly's sister. She works as a waitress and is very popular among the café's customers. (Puppeteered by Liz Rule)
 Cook: Cook is a true French artiste, and seemingly the café's only kitchen employee. He is very sensitive, especially about his cooking, but is respected by the others. (Puppeteered by Will Conyers/Peter Wilson in the first series and Rod Primrose/Bob Parsons in the second)
 Lonely: A quiet and shy character who does not appear to have any friends, though he claims to be waiting for someone and has been doing so for a very long time. (Puppeteered by Peter Wilson/Roy McNeill in the first series and Bob Parsons in the second)
 Oscar the Orange Ocelot: A criminal ocelot in disguise who camouflages himself and frames others to stay out of trouble. Despite that, he was once Lonely's friend. (Puppeteered by Franceso "Frank" Italiano in the second series)

Episodes

Series 1 (1992)

Episode 1 and 2: A Load of Old Rubbish (8 May 1992)

Episode 3 and 4: Destroy (15 May 1992)

Episode 5 and 6: Which One? (22 May 1992)

Episode 7 and 8: That's Not Fair (29 May 1992)

Episode 9 and 10: Because It Feels Good (5 June 1992)

Episode 11 and 12: Into The Unknown (12 June 1992)

Episode 13 and 14: Once I Grew (19 June 1992)

Episode 15 and 16: Something Tells Me (26 June 1992)

Episode 17 and 18: The Wheel Turns (3 July 1992)

Episode 19 and 20: Out of Order (10 July 1992)

Episode 21 and 22: Above and Beyond (17 July 1992)

Episode 23 and 24: I Can! (24 July 1992)

Episode 25 and 26: Remember (31 July 1992)

Episode 27 and 28: Clash (7 August 1992)

Episode 29 and 30: For Sale (14 August 1992)

Episode 31 and 32: Face (21 August 1992)

Episode 33 and 34: Going Under (28 August 1992)

Episode 35 and 36: Illusion Is All (4 September 1992)

Episode 37 and 38: Beneath The Skin (11 September 1992)

Episode 39 and 40: Real Friends (18 September 1992)

Episode 41 and 42: Lost (25 September 1992)

Episode 43 and 44: Funday (2 October 1992)

Episode 45 and 46: No Entry (9 October 1992)

Episode 47 and 48: Wanting (16 October 1992)

Episode 49 and 50: Threads (23 October 1992)

Episode 51 and 52: All Together Now (30 October 1992)

Series 2 (1995)
Series two premiered on 17 February 1995.

Episode 53 and 54: Brand New (17 February 1995 and 20 February 1995)

Episode 55 and 56: Under Pressure (21 February 1995 and 22 February 1995)

Episode 57 and 58: What's Missing (23 February 1995 and 24 February 1995)

Episode 59 and 60: My World (27 February 1995 and 28 February 1995)

Episode 61 and 62: Would I Lie (1 March 1995 and 2 March 1995)

Episode 63 and 64: Give and Take (3 March 1995 and 6 March 1995)

Episode 65 and 66: Far Out (7 March 1995 and 8 March 1995)

Episode 67 and 68: Out of This World (9 March 1995 and 10 March 1995)

Episode 69 and 70: Shape I'm In (13 March 1995 and 14 March 1995)

Episode 71 and 72: Heroes (15 March 1995 and 16 March 1995)

Episode 73 and 74: In Your Shoes (17 March 1995 and 20 March 1995)

Episode 75 and 76: Not Alone (21 March 1995 and 22 March 1995)

Episode 77 and 78: From Where I Stand (23 March 1995 and 24 March 1995)

Other Lift Off Materials and Shows

Lift Off Live! The Musical
Lift Off Live! The Musical combined some of the most popular elements of Lift Off whilst maintain its strong educational focus. It opened on 4 January 1995 to a packed house at the Sydney opera House, presented by the ACTF in association with Back Row Productions Pty Ltd and the Fox Kids Network. It went on to tour Melbourne, Adelaide, Brisbane, Perth, and some rural towns during 1996. The show performed 40 times over 20 days to an average audience capacity of 80%. Fox Kids Network was a sponsor of the Sydney season.

It was a musical based on the Wakadoo Café-a story of friendship and betrayal, unity and division. Mr Fish (Mark Mitchell) and Lotis (the highly intelligent talking lift) stumble into the Wakadoo Café. Mr Fish confronts the Wakadoo regulars-Wolf; Boris, Morris and Doris; Boss; Zelda; Lonely; and EC. Mr Fish seeks trouble while EC and children in the audience try to stop him.

A wealth of theatre experience was brought to the production: produced by the Foundation's Director, Dr Patricia Edgar, and Helena Harris, whose credits included EC Plays Lift Off and Bananas in Pyjamas, the show was directed by Wayne Harrison and designed by Kim Carpenter, both from the Sydney Theatre Company. Composer Chris Neal had more than fifteen years experience composing music for television and feature films and the career of Choreographer, Tony Bartuccio, spanned more than thirty years at the time. Garth Boomer worked with composer Chris Neal, to develop the story and songs for the show. Nine new songs were created for the show.

Activity Notes featuring activities and games based on the Lift Off Live musical were written by primary school specialist, Shirley Sydenham. The notes were published by the Foundation as was a copy of the Musical theatre Script and the compact disc featuring the music from the show. The materials were published to coincide with the commencement of the Melbourne season to Lift Off Live at the end of June 1996.

EC Plays Lift Off
EC plays Lift Off was a 13-episode game show with strong links to Lift Off produced by the Foundations in association with the ABC over two weeks in December 1993, at the ABC studies in Melbourne. It was developed from a concept by Patricia Edgar, Susie Campbell and Paul Nichola. The series was produced by Helena Harris and directed by Stephen Jones. Otello Stolfo, who designed the Lift Off Wakadoo Café, designed the game show set. Bernadette Wynack was the Art Director of the series, and Deborah Allen created the game tasks.

Starring in the series is Mark Mitchell who as Mr Fish from Lift Off is the host of the game show. Also appearing in each program was EC, as the instigator of the show, and the Wakadoo Café's wolf and three pigs who are seen enjoying the game in front of their television at home.

On each show two teams of children aged from 6 to 11 take part in games related to Lift Off. As each team completes a task it is awarded a patch. The first team to cover its game board with patches is the winning team.

It was produced towards the end of 1993 in association with the Australian Broadcasting Corporation (ABC). It screened on the ABC at 8:30 am on Sunday from 10 April 1994 to 4 July 1994. It re-screened at 10:15 am weekdays from 4 July 1995.

Lift Off to distance education
Following enquires from schools of Distance Education from around Australia it was decided to make the printed materials written for the Lift Off to Distance Education project available in a computer disc format to each of the States/Territories. This assisted with the incorporation of the Lift Off to Distance Education materials into early childhood curriculum programs where possible. OTEN in New South Wales trailed this with sections of their school community.

Lift Off to Fire Safety
The video and book package, Lift off to Fire Safety, was officially launched on Monday 9 October 1995, at the Metropolitan Fire Brigade's eastern Hill Fire Station and Museum. The video and book package was sent free of charge to every primary school in Australia during National Fire Safety Week. This project was made possible by two major sponsors, Ramsay Health Care and BRK Brands (makers of First Alert smoke detectors).

In November, a competition was held with the mail out to all primary schools of the Lift off to Fire Safety educational materials. Over 200 schools across Australia entered the competition and state winners were selected with entries being judged by BRK Brands and the Australian Children's Television Foundation. The winning schools each received prize of 'First Alert' fire safety products. The Lift off to Fire Safety materials were then made available for purchase from the Foundation.

Lift Off Interactive
The Foundation and Deakin University constructed a prototype module of the Lift Off game concept for CD ROM in 1997. The aims of the project were to create a meaningful training environment for postgraduate students of Deakin University, while exploring the potential for a commercial product for the Foundation. The Foundation was committed to establishing links with government training schemes and exploring mutually beneficial partnerships with trainees for the new media industry that was emerging at the time.

Teachers Online
This was a web based resource of learning activities based on the Foundation's programs. It was developed for use in primary and secondary schools and all learning activities were linked to the nationally agreed Curriculum Statements and Profiles. It included 13 theme based learning activities for middle primary; and seven learning based activities around teaching viewing, for teachers of lower and middle primary years.

Awards and nominations

Reviews

Lift Off
 "Lift Off promises to be one of the most adventurous uses of television of the 90s" James Cockington, The Sydney Morning Herald, 30 December 1991
 "It is no exaggeration to say that Lift Off is the most exciting project in the history of children’s television" The West Magazine, The West Australian, Perth, 2 May 1992
 "If time, money and creative energy count for anything, Lift Off must be regarded as the most important piece of television made in Australia" TV Guide, The Herald-Sun, Melbourne, 8 May 1992
 "Lift Off...has already won an army of viewers" The Sunday Times, Perth, 31 May 1992
 "Very occasionally something comes along, even in its early and most unformed stages, causes the hairs on the back of the neck to prickle with excitement: suddenly you realise you are witnessing something Very Special Indeed...There is a lot more to Lift Off than mere fun and education...this one should run and run" Diane Simmonds, The Bulletin, 5 May 1992
 "The most ambitious and satisfying children’s series ever produced in Australia" Sunday Telegraph, Sydney, 3 May 1992
 "At last, something challenging and creative for our youngest viewers!...As a lecturer and researcher specialising in children’s television, I recommend Lift Off to parents, children, and teachers as superb entertainment and as a learning resource" Lee Burton, Green Guide, The Age, 21 May 1992
 "It will revolutionise children’s viewing" Mary Maxwell, The Weekly Times, Melbourne, 29 April 1929
 "The consistent highlight of kids' viewing...will be...Lift Off" The Sunday Age, Melbourne, 10 May 1992
 "A new era in children’s television is about to begin" Mirjana Jovetic, TV Guide, The Herald-Sun, Melbourne, 6 May 1992
 "It is difficult to do justice to these programs, so much talent and energy has gone into them" Dennis Pryor, The Age, Melbourne, 30 May 1992
 "This is dazzling kids entertainment centred on many an educational and environmental message, and the sheer creativity behind it all is-to use a word popular among the age group at which it is aimed-awesome" Laurie Masterson, TV Week, 9 May 1992
 "Lift Off, a lively mix of drama, animation and puppetry...looks set for success" Green Guide, The Age, 7 May 1992
 "Lift Off was extraordinarily good" First Lady, Mrs Barbara Bush, The Canberra Times, 4 January 1992
 "...brilliant new series...its success is assured" Mark Wallace, Canberra Times, 4 May 1992
 "An inspired children’s education programme" The Advocate, Burnie, 4 May 1992

Lift Off Live!

Sydney Season
"The best kids activity in Sydney this summer", Radio 2UE

"It’s a hit", Sunday Telegraph, 7 January 1996

"Lift Off Live is a classy and riotously funny piece of kids' theatre...this show has moments of real theatrical magic between the thigh-slapping comedy and audience interaction", The Sydney Morning Herald, 8 January 1996

"Lift Off Live rips merrily along song, dance, big-laugh silliness, a production whole-heartedly focused on its pint sized audience", The Sun-Herald, 7 January 1996

"this children’s musical was a hit from start to finish", Weekly Southern Courier, 16 January 1996

"Lift Off Live...has the audience dancing in the aisles...Lots of fun", Daily Telegraph Mirror, 15 January 1996

Melbourne season
"pure school holiday entertainment", Herald Sun, 2 July 1996

"a pretty sophisticated piece of children’s theatre...kids can really yell their lungs out in this one", Sunday Age, 7 July 1996

"outrageous and colourful fun", The Age Entertainment Guide, 5 July 1996

Discography
 Songs from Lift-Off 1 (1992) – ABC Music
 More Songs from Lift-Off 2 (1992) – ABC Music
 Wakadoo Café (1993) – ABC Music
 EC's Favourite Songs (1993) – ABC Music
 Songs and Stories from Lift-Off (1994) – ABC Music
 Wakadoo Rap and Other Songs and Stories from Lift-Off 2 (1995) – ABC Music
 Brand New Songs from Lift-Off (1995) – ABC Music
 Lift-Off Live: Songs from the Musical (1995) – ACTF Records
 Lift-Off Live: Songs from the Musical [Remastered Original Cast Recording] (2022) – Silbert Records
 Songs from Lift-Off [The Chris Neal Collection] (2022) – Silbert Records

Videography
 Lift-Off at the Wakadoo Café (1992) – ABC Video
 The Story of E.C. (1992) – ABC Video
 Mr. Fish and Lotis (1992) – ABC Video
 The Animated Stories (1992) – ABC Video
 EC, Nipper and Aku (1993) – ABC Video
 Songs from Lift-Off (1993) – ABC Video
 EC and the Lift-Off Kids (1993) – ABC Video
 EC, Poss and Kim (1994) – ABC Video
 Imagine, EC and Me (1995) – ABC Video
 Lift-Off To Fire Safety (1995) – ACTF

References

External links
 Official website

Australian Broadcasting Corporation original programming
Personal development television series
Children's comedy television series
1992 Australian television series debuts
1995 Australian television series endings
Australian television shows featuring puppetry
Stop-motion animated television series
Television shows set in Melbourne
Australian children's education television series
Australian children's animated education television series
Australian preschool education television series
Television series about children